Louleh a.s Shiraz was a professional Iranian basketball club based in Shiraz, Iran. The team competes in the Iranian Basketball Super League.

Notable former players
  Ali Doraghi
  Milan Vučićević
  Saša Zagorac
  Kevin Sheppard

See also 
 The Iran Job

External links 
page on Asia-Basket

Basketball teams in Iran
Sport in Shiraz
Basketball teams established in 2005
2005 establishments in Iran
2017 disestablishments in Iran
Basketball teams disestablished in 2017